Donald Neil MacIver (born May 3, 1955 in Montreal, Quebec) is a Canadian retired professional ice hockey defenceman who played 6 games in the National Hockey League with the Winnipeg Jets during the 1979–80 season.

Playing career
MacIver played junior hockey in St. Lambert, Quebec with the Junior "B" St. Lambert Lions and the Junior "A" Rebelles de Longueuil.  He played college hockey with the Saint Mary's University Huskies in Halifax, Nova Scotia, and was an AUAA all-star and collegiate Most Valuable Player in his senior year.  After graduation from Saint Mary's, he signed a professional contract with the Jets for three years (1979–1982) and for one year with the New York Rangers after that.  With the exception of the six games that he played with Winnipeg, MacIver spent his professional career with the Tulsa Oilers of the Central Hockey League.  After hanging up the skates professionally, he attended the University of Tulsa and then Oklahoma State University College of Health Sciences, and as of 2021 he was an anesthesiologist in Tulsa, Oklahoma.

MacIver was a 1972 graduate of Chambly County High School in St. Lambert, Quebec.

Career statistics
Source:

Regular season and playoffs

References

1955 births
Living people
Anglophone Quebec people
Canadian expatriate ice hockey players in the United States
Canadian ice hockey defencemen
People from Saint-Lambert, Quebec
Ice hockey people from Montreal
Tulsa Oilers (1964–1984) players
Undrafted National Hockey League players
Winnipeg Jets (1979–1996) players